Jennifer Higgie is an Australian novelist, screenwriter, art critic and editor of the London-based contemporary arts magazine, Frieze.

The Australian band Falling Joys, whose lead singer is her sister Susie Higgie, released the song "Jennifer" in 1991 about her.

Career
Higgie has written features in Frieze on artists including Helen Johnson, Lynette Yiadom-Boakye, Pierre Huyghe Michael Borremans, Dirk Bell, Carol Rama, Lisa Yuskavage, and about the idea of slowness in art. Her publications include essays for Maria Lassnig at the Serpentine Gallery, Ricky Swallow's catalogue for the Australian Pavilion at the Venice Biennale 2005 entitled "The Past Sure is Tense; the Past Sure is Now"; Magnus Von Plessen's exhibition at Barbara Gladstone Gallery in New York and David Noonan's show Films and Paintings 2001-2005 at the Monash University Museum of Art in Melbourne. She also contributed an essay on the relationship between Brian Wilson and Glenn Campbell for Brian Wilson, An Art Book, edited by Alex Farquharson and published by four corners.

In 2017, her first children's book, 'There's Not One', was published by Scribe. It was shortlisted for the Australian Book Design Awards. In 2006 she published the novel Bedlam. She is also the writer of the recently completed independent feature film, I Really Hate My Job (2007), directed by Oliver Parker and starring Neve Campbell, Shirley Henderson, Alexandra Maria Lara and Danny Huston.

Bibliography 
 Bedlam. (Sternberg, 2006) 
The Mirror and the Palette: Rebellion, Revolution and Resilience: 500 Years of Women's Self-Portraits. Weidenfeld, 2021)

References

External links
Frieze Foundation – Jennifer Higgie profile

21st-century Australian novelists
Australian art critics
Australian magazine editors
Australian screenwriters
Australian women novelists
Australian women art critics
Living people
Place of birth missing (living people)
Year of birth missing (living people)
21st-century Australian women writers
Women magazine editors
21st-century Australian screenwriters